This is a list of the Sites of Special Scientific Interest (SSSIs) in the Caerphilly Area of Search (AoS).

History
This Area of Search was formed from parts of the previous AoSs of Gwent and Mid & South Glamorgan.

Sites
Aberbargoed Grasslands
Cefn Onn
Cefn y Brithdir
Coed-y-darren
Dan y Graig Quarry, Risca
Gwaun Gledyr
Llanbradach Quarry
Lower House Stream Section
Memorial Park Meadows
Nelson Bog
Penllwyn Grasslands
Ruperra Castle and Woodlands
Wern Ddu Claypits

See also
 List of SSSIs by Area of Search

References

 
Caerphilly